Hongor or Khongor (soft or sweetheart) is a frequent compound of toponymics both in Mongolia and in Inner Mongolia, China, for example:
Khongor, Darkhan-Uul, a sum (district) in northern Mongolia,
Khan khongor, Ömnögovi, a sum in southern Mongolia,
Bayankhongor, an aimag (province) in southwest Mongolia,
Bayankhongor, the administrative center of Bayankhongor aimag,
Khongoryn Els, sand dunes in southern Mongolia's Gobi Gurvansaikhan National Park,
Honggor (Siziwang Banner), a sum in Ulanqab, Inner Mongolia,
Honggor (Sonid Left Banner), a sum in Xilin Gol aimag, Inner Mongolia.

Hongort

Hongort, a town (镇) in Chahar Right Back Banner, Ulanqab, Inner Mongolia